Effretikon is a railway station in the Swiss canton of Zürich and municipality of Illnau-Effretikon. The station, which takes its name from the village of Effretikon, is located on the Zürich to Winterthur main line at the junction point with the Effretikon to Hinwil line.

Service 
Effretikon is an important junction in the Zürich S-Bahn network. It is  an intermediate stop on services S3, S7, S8 and S24. On weekends, there are three nighttime S-Bahn services (SN1, SN6, SN8) offered by ZVV.

Summary of all S-Bahn services:

 Zürich S-Bahn:
 Nighttime S-Bahn (only during weekends):

Gallery

References

External links 

 

Effretikon
Effretikon
Illnau-Effretikon